Ronnie Deauville (August 28, 1925 in Miami, Florida - December 24, 1990 in Vero Beach, Florida) was a Sinatra-style singer who first became interested in singing while he was in naval air corps during the Second World War. His favorite band was Tommy Dorsey and his singing style reflected admiration for Frank Sinatra's leading vocalist.

After the war, a Paramount Pictures talent finder discovered Ronnie when he saw him singing in a
small theater play in Hollywood. Thanks to that Ronnie got his first contract in professional Glen
Gray's Orchestra. In the following years, Ronnie worked with all the great groups of that time, and as
a solo artist he sang at shows such as Ted Mack Family TV and The Colgate Comedy Hour. He was
also a guest artist in several top nightclubs such as Mocambo in Los Angeles and El Mirador in Palm
Springs.

Life
However, his vocal career was not very long because in September 1956 Ronnie had a car accident,
got polio and was paralyzed from the neck down. It was only a few months before the Salk vaccine
was invented. Ronnie spent more than a year on artificial lungs.
There was almost no chance for Ronnie to come back to singing because he had virtually no breath
control.
After months of hard work, Ronnie returned to the local TV show in Los Angeles. He continued to
perform other presentations until he had to stop for the health sake. Ronnie ended up on the
wheelchair for the rest of his life.

End of career

Ronnie's career was suppressed but not completely destroyed. Ralph Edwards soon worked out the
story of Ronnie in his television show This Is Your Life. This show became so popular that Ronnie
was able to find work in the film dubbing industry for 20th Century-Fox, Warner Brothers and Allied
Artists. He died of cancer on Christmas Eve of 1990.

References

20th-century American singers
1925 births
1990 deaths
Singers from Florida
Musicians from Miami
Deaths from cancer in Florida
20th-century American male singers